The Great South West Walk is a / 262-kilometer (163mi) walking track, established in 1981, located in South West Victoria, Australia. A short portion of the track is located with the Lower Glenelg River Conservation Park in South Australia, near .

The track is administered, maintained and promoted by The Friends of the Great South West Walk Inc., a volunteer organisation, in partnership with Parks Victoria.

Track
The Great South West Walk track, which notionally begins and ends at the Visitor Information Centre in Portland, traverses forest, river gorge, high cliff tops and bays.  It was designed as a long-distance walking track, with the option for short and day walks.  It is accessed from roads in and near the towns of Portland and Nelson.  The walk's difficulty is rated as moderate, and consists of fifteen sections of varying lengths.  The walk contains 14 camp sites along the track; all supplied with fresh water, cleared tent sites and bush toilets. All overnight stays at 14 campsites require an online booking and a fee.  Links to the online booking site can be accessed via the walk's website: www.greatsouthwestwalk.com

The entire length of the circuit is 251-kilometers if you proceed direct along the beach from Swan Lake Camp, or 262-kilometers (and an extra day) if you  head inland from Swan Lake Camp to Tarragal Camp. After Tarragal Camp the inland route returns to the coast near the Bridgewater Lakes.

Part of the track follows the course of the Glenelg River, with other parts located adjacent to the Southern Ocean.

Sections
The track consists of the following sections and points:

See also

 Great Ocean Walk
 List of long-distance hiking tracks in Australia

References

External links
 
 
 

Hiking and bushwalking tracks in Victoria (Australia)
Barwon South West (region)
Western District (Victoria)
Limestone Coast
Hiking and bushwalking tracks in South Australia